The 2006 Ball State Cardinals football team competed in football on behalf of the Ball State University during the 2006 NCAA Division I FBS football season. They were led by head coach Brady Hoke.

Schedule

References

Ball State
Ball State Cardinals football seasons
Ball State Cardinals football